Benjamin Hoffmann (born 13 November 1985) is a French creative writer and professor at The Ohio State University in Columbus, Ohio. He's the author of novels and essays published in France and the United States. He specializes in the literature and culture of eighteenth-century France, and is the author of books and articles on transatlantic studies, the introduction of Buddhism in the West, and literary theory.

Biography
Born in France in 1985, Benjamin Hoffmann studied literature and philosophy at the University of Bordeaux, Sorbonne University, and the École Normale Supérieure in Paris. His first book, Le monde est beau on peut y voyager, was published in 2008 by Éditions Bastingage. In 2009, he became Language Assistant in the Department of French at Amherst College. The sudden death of his father, Patrick Hoffmann, was the topic of his next book, Père et fils, published in 2011 by Éditions Gallimard. Also in 2011, he published his second novel, Anya Ivanovna with Éditions Bastingage. In 2015, he earned a Ph.D from Yale University after finishing a dissertation dedicated to the representations of North America in eighteenth-century French Literature. He is currently Associate Professor at The Ohio State University where he teaches Early Modern French Literature and creative writing.

Awards 
Hoffmann received the Best PhD Dissertation Award ("Marguerite A. Peyre Prize") from the Department of French at Yale University in 2015. He also received a scholarship for academic excellence from the Sorbonne, and a Fellowship from the Whiting Foundation.

Books
 L'Île de la Sentinelle, novel, Paris, Éditions Gallimard, coll. Blanche, 2022 
 Les Paradoxes de la postérité, monograph, Éditions de Minuit, coll. Paradoxe, 2019, 
 L'Amérique posthume, monograph, Éditions Classiques Garnier, coll. L'Europe des Lumières, 2019 
 Lezay-Marnésia, Lettres écrites des rives de l'Ohio, critical edition, Éditions Classiques Garnier, coll. Americana, 2019 
 American Pandemonium, novel, Paris, Éditions Gallimard, coll. L’Arpenteur, 2016 
 Père et fils, Paris, Éditions Gallimard, coll. L’Arpenteur, 2011 
 Anya Ivanovna, novel, Bordeaux, Éditions Bastingage, 2011 
 Le monde est beau on peut y voyager, novel, Bordeaux, Éditions Bastingage, 2008

Books in English
 The Paradoxes of Posterity, translated by Alan J. Singerman, Penn State UP, 2020 
 Posthumous America, translated by Alan J. Singerman, Penn State UP, 2018 
 Lezay-Marnésia, Letters Written from the Banks of the Ohio, translated by Alan J. Singerman, Penn State UP, 2017

References

External links
 OSU Faculty Homepage
 Author's Website
 Benjamin Hoffmann: Éditions de Minuit.
 Benjamin Hoffmann: Éditions Gallimard.

1985 births
Living people
21st-century French essayists
21st-century French male writers
Ohio State University faculty